Michael John Polich (born December 19, 1952) is an American  former professional ice hockey player who played 226 games in the National Hockey League in 1977–81. He won the 1977 Stanley Cup with the Montreal Canadiens and featured in the 1981 Stanley Cup Finals with the Minnesota North Stars.

Polich was a college hockey star for the University of Minnesota and also played for Team USA at the 1974 and 1975 Ice Hockey World Championship tournaments before signing a free agent contract with the Montreal Canadiens of the NHL in 1975. Polich spent most of the next three seasons in Canadiens system with their farm team the Nova Scotia Voyageurs of the American Hockey League, but he did get his name on the Stanley Cup in 1977 as a reserve on the Canadiens' championship winning team. He also played for Team USA in the inaugural 1976 Canada Cup tournament. Polich's NHL career finally took off after he signed for the Minnesota North Stars in 1978 where he became an accomplished defensive specialist and penalty killer. He finally retired in 1981 after three years as a regular North Star.

Awards and honors

References

External links 

1952 births
Living people
AHCA Division I men's ice hockey All-Americans
American men's ice hockey centers
Ice hockey players from Minnesota
Sportspeople from Hibbing, Minnesota
Minnesota Golden Gophers men's ice hockey players
Minnesota North Stars players
Montreal Canadiens players
Nova Scotia Voyageurs players
Undrafted National Hockey League players
NCAA men's ice hockey national champions